The women's 10,000 metres event at the 2002 Commonwealth Games was held on 30 July.

Results

References
Official results
Results at BBC

10000
2002
2002 in women's athletics